The Nao Victoria Museum is located in Punta Arenas, Chile, and has been open to the public since 1 October 2011. The museum is private, the owner has received the Medal of the President of Chile for his work in promoting national identity during the celebrations for the bicentenary of the independence of the South American country. Spanish Vice Consul in Punta Arenas gave the entrepreneur the prize "Hispanic Identity" for the building of the Nao Victoria Replica.

Aim of the Museo Nao Victoria 

The museum's goal is to be interactive and offer its visitors the experience of interacting with replicas of the ships that contributed to the discovery of the area, colonization of the territory, or have a special and historic heritage significance for the Magallanes Region of Chile. The replicas were built using traditional shipbuilding techniques.

Collections 

The main collection of the museum is the full-size replicas of historic ships on display along the Straits of Magellan. Replicas of weapons and ancient navigation tools are also exhibited as well as copies of documents and books relating to the historic ships and an outdoor shipbuilding workshop.

Replicas 

Today the museum has three ship replicas:

Nao Victoria

Later, commanded by Juan Sebastian Elcano, she was the only ship of the five to complete the first-time circumnavigation of the globe. Commanded by Duarte Barbosa, Nao Victoria participated in the Discovery of Chile, being the first to explore the region in 1520, and discovering or naming Patagonia, Cape Virgenes, the Straits of Magellan, Tierra del Fuego, the Pacific Ocean and other milestones.

She is one of the most famous ships in history of navigation.

James Caird

James Caird, was a lifeboat of the Endurance, adapted by Harry McNish, and sailed from Elephant Island to South Georgia during Sir Ernest Shackleton's 1916 Imperial Trans-Antarctic Expedition. Many historians consider the feat of the crew of James Caird to be the most impressive of all global navigation.

Schooner Ancud

Ancud was the ship that, under an 1843 mandate of the President of Chile, Manuel Bulnes, claimed the Strait of Magellan on behalf of Chile's newly independent government, building Fort Bulnes. Commander of the schooner was Captain John Williams Wilson.  On 31 December 2011, the museum announced the construction of a replica of the schooner in its shipbuilding workshop;  the replica Ancud was opened to public on 5 September 2012.

HMS Beagle

, a British Navy brig-sloop, was converted into an exploration vessel. The most famous of her three trips was the second one under the command of Captain FitzRoy. On board was the young Charles Darwin. HMS Beagle remained in the Magellan región for almost three years, and the observations made by Darwin were influential in the development of his theory of evolution. The construction of the full-size HMS Beagle replica started in November 2012.  Four years later, in November 2016, the museum announced that the vessel was completed.

Other collections

Shipbuilding workshop

During summer 2013 the shipbuilding workshop of the Museum built a one third size scale replica of an 18th-century galleon.

See also 
 Ferdinand Magellan
 Magellan's circumnavigation
 Ginés de Mafra

References

External links 

 
 Article of the James Caird Society on Museo Nao Victoria's Replica
 Official HMS Beagle replica construction blog
 Official HMS Beagle replica website

Museo Nao Victoria
Museums in Magallanes Region
Maritime museums in Chile
History museums in Chile
Museums established in 2011
2011 establishments in Chile